Leende dansmusik 2012 is a 2012 Matz Bladhs studio album.

Track listing
Som rosor i regn (Carl Lösnitz, Calle Kindbom)
Säg att du vill (Thomas Berglund, Ulf Georgsson, Peter Samuelsson)
Jag kommer hem (Stefan Brunzell, Ulf Georgsson)
Klappar ditt hjärta bara för mig (Hans Rytterström)
En liten femöres kola (Alf Robertson)
Den gamla Moraklockan (Åke Fagerlund)
Himlens änglar gråter (Stefan Brunzell, Thomas G:son)
Minns du Maria (Schwartze Madonna) (Henry Mayer, Berle Günther, Hasse Carlsson)
Vår egen bröllopsdag (Mats Björklund, Elisabeth Lord, Harald Steinhauer)
När kärleken slår till (Hans Backström, Peter Bergqvist, Per-Arne Thigerberg)
Finns det nån annan (Stefan Brunzell, Ulf Georgsson, Tony Johansson)
60's medley
Hur kan solen lysa (Thomas Berglund, Agneta Mårtensson)
Ge oss år tillbaka (Marianne Carlsson)

Charts

References 

2012 albums
Matz Bladhs albums
Swedish-language albums